Kilchberg may refer to the following places:

In Switzerland
Kilchberg, Basel-Country
Kilchberg, Zürich

In Germany
Kilchberg (Tübingen), a part of Tübingen

See also
Kirchberg (disambiguation)